Aleksandra Wozniak was the defending champion, but lost to Daniela Hantuchová in the first round.

Marion Bartoli reached her second straight final and won the title, defeating Venus Williams 6–2, 5–7, 6–4.

Seeds

Main draw

Finals

Top half

Bottom half

External links
 WTA tournament draws

Singles
Bank of the West Classic
Bank of the West Classic - Singles